Andreas Anastasopoulos (born April 2, 1976) is a Greek track and field athlete in the shot put. From October 23, 2001 to October 22, 2003 he was suspended by the IAAF.

Achievements
 National Championships: (1st, shot put)

See also
List of sportspeople sanctioned for doping offences

References

External links

Greek male shot putters
Doping cases in athletics
Greek sportspeople in doping cases
1976 births
Living people
Place of birth missing (living people)
Athletes from Piraeus